Mezentsev is a Russian masculine surname, its feminine counterpart is Mezentseva. It may refer to
Dmitry Mezentsev (born 1959), Russian politician
Fyodor Mezentsev (born 1989), Kazakhstani speedskater
Galina Mezentseva (born 1952), Russian ballerina

See also
Mezentsev (crater)

Russian-language surnames